Amicia is a genus of flowering plants in the legume family, Fabaceae, and was recently assigned to the informal monophyletic Adesmia clade. It belongs to the subfamily Faboideae. It is named in honor of the Italian astronomer, mathematician and microscopist Giovanni Battista Amici (1786–1863).

References

Dalbergieae
Fabaceae genera